Brody  is a village in Starachowice County, Świętokrzyskie Voivodeship, in south-central Poland. It is the seat of the gmina (administrative district) called Gmina Brody.

The village has a population of 1,737.

References

Brody
Kielce Voivodeship (1919–1939)